Valdez Venita Demings (née Butler; born March 12, 1957) is an American politician and former police officer who served as the U.S. representative from  from 2017 to 2023. The district covers most of the western half of Orlando and includes much of the area around Orlando's resort parks. It includes many of Orlando's western suburbs, including Apopka and Winter Garden. From 2007 to 2011, Demings was chief of the Orlando Police Department, its first female chief, capping a 27-year career with the department. She has also been first lady of Orange County, Florida, since December 4, 2018, when her husband Jerry Demings was sworn in as the mayor.

Demings was the Democratic nominee to represent Florida's 10th congressional district in Congress in both 2012 and 2016. After losing in 2012 to Republican incumbent Daniel Webster, she won in 2016 after the State Supreme Court mandated redistricting statewide.

On January 15, 2020, House Speaker Nancy Pelosi selected Demings to serve as a House impeachment manager in the first Senate trial of President Donald Trump. In early August 2020, Demings was said to be one of the top contenders to be Joe Biden's vice-presidential running mate in the 2020 United States presidential election, along with Kamala Harris and Susan Rice. She was the Democratic nominee in the 2022 United States Senate election in Florida, losing to Republican incumbent Marco Rubio.

Early life and education
Valdez Venita Butler was born on March 12, 1957, one of seven children born to a poor family; her father worked as a janitor, her mother as a maid. They lived in Mandarin, a neighborhood in Jacksonville, Florida. She attended segregated schools in the 1960s and graduated from Wolfson High School in 1975.

Demings became interested in a career in law enforcement after serving in the "school patrol" at Dupont Junior High School. She attended Florida State University, graduating with a degree in criminology in 1979. In 1996, Demings earned a master's degree in public administration from Webster University Orlando.

Early career
After graduating from college, Demings worked as a state social worker in Jacksonville for 18 months.

In 1983, Demings applied for a job with the Orlando Police Department (OPD); her first assignment was on patrol on Orlando's west side. Demings was appointed chief of the Orlando Police Department in 2007, becoming the first woman to lead the department. From 2007 to 2011, she oversaw a 40% decrease in violent crime.

According to a 2015 article in The Atlantic, the Orlando Police Department "has a long record of excessive-force allegations, and a lack of transparency on the subject, dating back at least as far as Demings's time as chief." A 2008 Orlando Weekly exposé described the Orlando Police Department as "a place where rogue cops operate with impunity, and there's nothing anybody who finds himself at the wrong end of their short fuse can do about it." Demings responded with an op-ed in the Orlando Sentinel, writing, "Looking for a negative story in a police department is like looking for a prayer at church", adding, "It won't take long to find one." In the same op-ed, she cast doubt on video evidence that conflicts with officers' statements in excessive force cases, writing, "a few seconds (even of video) rarely capture the entire set of circumstances."

In 2009, she had her firearm, a Sig Sauer P226R, stolen from her department vehicle while parked at her home; she was issued a written censure. The firearm has not been recovered.

Demings retired from her position as chief of OPD effective June 1, 2011, after serving with the OPD for 27 years.

U.S. House of Representatives

Elections

2016 

Demings was the Democratic nominee for the United States House of Representatives in Florida's 10th congressional district in the 2012 elections. She faced freshman Republican Daniel Webster in a district that had been made slightly more Republican than its predecessor in 2010. Demings narrowly lost, taking 48% of the vote to Webster's 51%.

Democrats attempted to recruit Demings to run against Webster again in 2014. She decided to run for mayor of Orange County, Florida, against Teresa Jacobs, instead, but dropped out of the mayoral race on May 20, 2014.

In 2015, Demings announced her candidacy for the 10th district seat after a court-ordered redistricting made the 10th significantly more Democratic ahead of the 2016 elections. Webster concluded the new 10th was unwinnable, and ran for reelection in the nearby 11th district.

Demings won the Democratic nomination on August 30 and the general election in November with 65% of the vote. She is the third Democrat to win this Orlando-based district since its creation in 1973 (it was numbered as the 5th from 1973 to 1993, the 8th from 1993 to 2013, and has been the 10th since 2013).

2018 
In her 2018 reelection campaign, Demings was unopposed for a second term.

2020 
On May 21, 2020, Demings confirmed she was on "the shortlist" to be Joe Biden's vice presidential nominee for the 2020 presidential election. She said she would accept the role if offered. Some critics, including Black Lives Matter activists, criticized her record as Orlando police chief. Kamala Harris was announced as Biden's running mate on August 11, 2020. In November 2020, Demings was named a candidate for United States Secretary of Homeland Security in the Biden administration.

Tenure

Demings was sworn in on January 3, 2017. She is a member of the New Democrat Coalition and the Congressional Black Caucus.

As of March 2022, Demings had voted in line with Biden's stated position 100% of the time.

Committee assignments
 Committee on Homeland Security
 Subcommittee on Border and Maritime Security
 Committee on the Judiciary
 Subcommittee on Crime, Terrorism, Homeland Security, and Investigations (Vice Chair)
 Subcommittee on Regulatory Reform, Commercial and Antitrust Law
 Permanent Select Committee on Intelligence
Subcommittee on Defense Intelligence and Warfighter Support
Subcommittee on Intelligence Modernization and Readiness

Caucus memberships
New Democrat Coalition
Congressional Black Caucus

2022 U.S. Senate campaign

In June 2021, Demings announced her candidacy for the Democratic nomination in Florida's 2022 U.S. Senate election. The incumbent U.S. Senator, Republican Marco Rubio, ran for reelection in 2022. In March 2022, PolitiFact reported that Demings falsely claimed that Rubio supported tax hikes. She lost to Rubio in the November 8, 2022, general election.

Political positions

Abortion

Demings received a 100% voting score from NARAL Pro-Choice America for 2017, 2018, and 2019. She received a 100% rating from Planned Parenthood Action Fund for 2020. She has an F rating from the anti-abortion Susan B. Anthony List.

Civil liberties

Demings received a 100% rating from the American Civil Liberties Union for the 117th Congress.

Climate and environment 
Demings received a 97% lifetime rating from the League of Conservation Voters based on scores from 2017 to 2021.

Filibuster
Demings supports eliminating the filibuster in the United States Senate.

Gun policy

Demings has said that she seeks to keep firearms out of the hands of "people who seek to do harm", saying that the gun control legislation she supports "isn’t about taking guns away from responsible, law-abiding people." She supported the Gun Violence Restraining Order Act of 2017, which would have provided a lawful method of temporarily confiscating firearms from people deemed to be a threat to themselves or others. Of the act, Demings said, "We must do what we can to make sure law enforcement has the tools it needs to more effectively perform the ever more challenging job of keeping us a safe nation. The Gun Violence Restraining Order Act is a major step to doing just that." After the Stoneman Douglas High School shooting in 2018, Demings opposed arming teachers, calling the idea "ridiculous" and saying it would "only shift the responsibility from lawmakers to others. It shifts the pain, the hurt, and the guilt to school staff who will find themselves outskilled and outgunned in active shooter situations."

Demings has an "F" rating from the National Rifle Association (NRA). She has accused the NRA of "hijacking" conversations after mass shootings in the United States to make them about the Second Amendment.

Healthcare

Demings supports and has vowed to defend the Affordable Care Act.

In June 2019 Demings released a congressional report on insulin prices, criticizing manufacturers for raising prices well beyond manufacturing costs, and said it was "inexcusable that American families are dying for the sake of corporate profit."

Impeachments of President Donald Trump

On December 18, 2019, Demings voted for both articles of impeachment against President Donald Trump. She was selected as one of seven House impeachment managers who presented the impeachment case against Trump during his trial before the United States Senate.

On January 13, 2021, Demings voted for the single article of impeachment in the second impeachment of President Donald Trump.

2021 U.S. Electoral College vote count

Citing the unusually contested 2021 United States Electoral College vote count and the 2021 storming of the United States Capitol, Demings joined Representative Cori Bush in sponsoring House Resolution 25 on January 11, 2021, seeking to expel the 138 Republican U.S. Representatives who voted to object to the electoral college certification.

Personal life
Demings's husband, Jerry Demings, is mayor of Orange County, Florida, and the former Orange County Sheriff. He served as the chief of the Orlando Police Department, the first African American to do so, from 1999 to 2002. The two met on patrol in the OPD; they married in 1988 and have three children.

Demings is a member of The Links and Delta Sigma Theta sorority.

See also
 List of African-American United States representatives
 Women in the United States House of Representatives

References

External links

 

 

|-

|-

1957 births
20th-century African-American people
20th-century African-American women
21st-century African-American women
21st-century American politicians
21st-century American women politicians
African-American members of the United States House of Representatives
African-American people in Florida politics
African-American police officers
American women police officers
Candidates in the 2012 United States elections
Candidates in the 2014 United States elections
Candidates in the 2022 United States Senate elections
Chiefs of the Orlando Police Department
Delta Sigma Theta members
Democratic Party members of the United States House of Representatives from Florida
Female members of the United States House of Representatives
Florida State University alumni
Living people
Politicians from Jacksonville, Florida
Women in Florida politics
Webster University alumni